Yevgeny Ivanovich Lopatin (26 December 1917 – 21 July 2011) was a Soviet weightlifter. He competed at the 1952 Summer Olympics in Helsinki and won a silver medal in the lightweight division.

Biography
Lopatin was born in Balashov to a locksmith and a teacher of Russian. His father and younger sister died of cholera when he was 3, and the rest of the family suffered malnourishment during the Russian Civil War. They moved to Saratov, where in 1937 Lopatin took up weightlifting wishing to become stronger and healthier. The same year he married his classmate at school, Lidiya; they had a son Sergei, born on 19 March 1939.

Lopatin's success in local and regional tournaments was interrupted by World War II. By then he lived with his family in Leningrad. His second son was born there in 1942, but died of malnutrition. The family was evacuated around 1942, first Lopatin and then his wife and son. Later Lopatin was enlisted to the Soviet Army. He was injured in the Battle of Stalingrad and for many months after that could not use his left hand. He spent the rest of the war recovering as a coach at a military school.
After the war Lopatin resumed his weightlifting career and reigned as the Soviet featherweight champion in 1947, 1948, and 1950, finishing as runner-up in 1945, 1946, and 1949, and in third place in 1951. He took silver in the division at the 1947 European Weightlifting Championships in Helsinki and gold in the same event at the 1950 edition in Paris. That same year he took silver in the featherweight division at the World Weightlifting Championships. As competition in the featherweight field grew, Lopatin switched to the lightweight division and once again became the Soviet champion prior to his attendance at the 1952 Summer Olympics, after which he announced his retirement from active competition. He worked as a coach at Dynamo Stadium in Moscow from 1949 through 1998. He died on 21 July 2011.

References

External links

Yevgeny Lopatin's profile at chidlovski.net

1917 births
2011 deaths
People from Balashov
People from Balashovsky Uyezd
Sportspeople from Saratov Oblast
Olympic medalists in weightlifting
Olympic silver medalists for the Soviet Union
Olympic weightlifters of the Soviet Union
Soviet military personnel of World War II
Soviet male weightlifters
Weightlifters at the 1952 Summer Olympics
Medalists at the 1952 Summer Olympics
Russian male weightlifters
European Weightlifting Championships medalists
World Weightlifting Championships medalists
Honoured Masters of Sport of the USSR